The Boley Historic District (BHD), in Boley, Oklahoma is the original business area of an all-black town founded in 1903. The town of Boley prospered from the time of its incorporation until the onset of the Great Depression. According to the Encyclopedia of Oklahoma History and Culture, Boley became the largest and best-known of all the All-Black Towns. African-Americans migrated from other states to escape the Jim Crow Laws that promoted discrimination against them. However, falling farm prices starting in the late 1920s, caused many agricultural workers to move elsewhere in the county, and Boley began to decline.

BHD was declared a National Historic Landmark in 1975.

It is roughly bounded by Seward Avenue, Walnut and Cedar Streets, and the southern city limits of Boley. The district includes 14 buildings or other structures, all built between 1903 and 1921, which are considered supporting structures.

 
More recent construction in Boley has had little or no effect on the historic character of the BHD. According to the NRHP application, "It is still considered by many of the town's senior residents to be as much the same as before."

A group of photographic images attached to the NRHP inventory document have been published on the web. These were taken in 1974, and show that time has not been kind to the buildings and structures that still remain. Many appear to be abandoned or neglected and in various stages of decay.

See also
List of National Historic Landmarks in Oklahoma
National Register of Historic Places listings in Okfuskee County, Oklahoma

References

External links
Boley Oklahoma history webpage
Encyclopedia of Oklahoma History and Culture - All-Black Towns

Historic districts on the National Register of Historic Places in Oklahoma
National Historic Landmarks in Oklahoma
Geography of Okfuskee County, Oklahoma
Populated places established in 1903
National Register of Historic Places in Okfuskee County, Oklahoma
1903 establishments in Indian Territory